Guenoc may refer to:
Guenoc, California
Guenoc Valley AVA